Bob Bodor is an American fencing administrator and a former football player and coach. He is the senior member services manager for the United States Fencing Association.  Bodor served as the head football coach at Colorado College from 2003 to 2008 and at Rensselaer Polytechnic Institute (RPI) in Troy, New York in 2012, compiling a career college football coaching record of 20–46.

Head coaching record

References

Year of birth missing (living people)
Living people
Albion Britons football coaches
Colorado College Tigers football coaches
Columbia Lions football coaches
Denison Big Red football players
Hartwick Hawks football coaches
Johns Hopkins Blue Jays football coaches
Penn Quakers football coaches
RPI Engineers football coaches